Jonathan S. Melton is an American lawyer and politician. He is one of the first two openly gay people to serve on the Raleigh City Council. He is the current Chairman of the Raleigh City Council's Economic Development and Innovation Committee. Melton is also a founding board member of Stonewall Sports, a national LGBTQ philanthropic sports league.

Education and law career 
Melton graduated from North Carolina State University in 2008 with a bachelor of arts degree in political science. While at State, he served as president of Delta Upsilon and was a member of the Honors Program. In 2011, he graduated magna cum laude from North Carolina Central University School of Law, where he was a member of Phi Delta Phi. He is a member of the Wake County Bar Association and the American Bar Association. Melton is a divorce lawyer who practices in Raleigh, North Carolina. In 2013, he joined the firm Gailor Hunt Jenkins Davis & Taylor as a law partner practicing divorce law after working as a judicial law clerk for Richard A. Elmore of the North Carolina Court of Appeals. On August 5, 2015 he wrote an article for Attorney At Law Magazine titled Aftermath of SCOTUS Marriage Equality Decision, which covered the legalization of same-sex marriage in the United States. Melton is a founding board member of Stonewall Sports, a national LGBTQ and allied philanthropic sports league. He also serves on the board of directors for TLC, formerly the Tammy Lynn Center. In 2017, he helped create an annual fundraising event for the North Carolina AIDS Action Network.

Political career 
Melton ran for Raleigh City Council in 2019 against sitting councilman Russ Stephenson. Melton was endorsed by Indy Week. He was elected to the council as an at-large member, defeating Stephenson, in October 2019. He and Saige Martin were the first two openly LGBTQ people to serve on the City Council. He serves as the Chairman of the City Council's Economic Development and Innovation Committee and is a member of the Transportation and Transit Committee. 

In January 2020, Melton, along with Mayor Mary-Ann Baldwin and Councilman Patrick Buffkin, drafted new rules that would allow Raleigh residents to use the names of city staff and council members during public comment grievances as long as they refrain from personal attacks.

In July 2020, Melton spearheaded an initiative to ask the North Carolina State Legislature to grant the city's Police Advisory Board oversight powers so that it could investigate and discipline police officers.

Melton accepted the maximum campaign donation allowed from developer John Kane in both the 2020 and 2022 election cycles. Kane, a Republican, has also donated to Lt. Governor Mark Robinson, who has routinely made homophobic and transphobic comments).  In addition, Kane was a founding member of Holy Trinity Anglican Church in Raleigh, which "left the Episcopal church in 2004 largely because of the national church's acceptance of a gay bishop in New Hampshire.

Tax Increment Grant (TIG) and Property Tax Increase
On May 4, 2021, Raleigh City Council approved a tax increment grant (TIG) policy. Despite accepting campaign donations from developer John Kane, for whom the TIG would benefit, Melton voted in favor of the policy.  The TIG policy allows the city of Raleigh to provide up to $5 million per year (2% of the annual budget) in tax rebates to private developers, effectively shielding them from increases in property taxes due to rising property values. A month later on June 1, 2021, Raleigh City Council passed an annual budget that included an increase in property taxes generating an increased $7 million per year which was supported by Melton. Critics of the TIG policy point to the combined actions of increasing property taxes on Raleigh residents and providing tax rebates for select private developers as an unfair redistribution of wealth from average residents to wealthy real estate developers.

The increase in property tax rates came at a time when property values throughout the Triangle region were climbing due to national trends in the housing market and impacts from the COVID-19 pandemic. While Melton was part of a coalition to increase property taxes for Raleigh residents, neighboring Durham County was working to implement a tax assistance program. On October 6th, 2021, Durham County tax office in partnership with the Durham department of social services launched a program to provide up to $750 of tax relief to qualifying residents as a means of combating gentrification and displacement of low-income residents.

Housing
Melton has campaigned on the issue of bringing more affordable housing to Raleigh, however during his time on council housing costs skyrocketed an estimated 42.5%. 

Jonathan Melton has also continuously taken campaign funds from John Kane, a real estate developer in the Raleigh area, who refuses to build affordable housing in his developments and directly contributes to the gentrification of low income areas in Raleigh.

Melton was part of a coalition strategy that primarily targeted increasing the housing supply and the density of housing through private market forces. Little effort was made to ensure affordable housing units were included when rezoning cases were brought before city council to increase density, with Mayor Baldwin and allies such as Melton repeatedly claiming that North Carolina state law prohibited inclusionary zoning. Critics of Raleigh City Council's housing policies point to the density bonus program implemented by Charlotte which allowed for height increases in existing zoning if private developers committed a certain percentage of units as affordable housing units. Others criticized the housing policies as naïve, saying the private market strategy relied on the premise that providing any type of housing would inevitably lead to a stabilization of housing prices for all types of housing; a flawed premise as for-profit developers primarily construct luxury style homes beyond the financial means of working-class residents. The rising prices of housing and rental costs in Raleigh that coincided with Melton's tenure likely increased the rate of displacement and gentrification occurring within the city substantially. Housing justice advocates with claim that this was the intent of Mayor Baldwin’s coalition policies from the start, and that Councilor Melton aided and abetted these harmful policies.

Citizen's Advisory Councils (CACs)
In February 2020, Councilor Saige Martin brought forward a motion to disband citizens’ advisory councils. These advisory councils were distributed geographically across the city and provided feedback for proposed rezoning. While CAC votes were non-binding, the votes would be taken into consideration by City Council along with the Planning Commission’s vote when deciding if a rezoning case should be approved. Supporters of CACs say they provided a mechanism for participatory democracy. Martin's motion to disband CACs by ceasing financial support by the city, and ending their involvement in any rezoning cases moving forward. Melton voted in favor of the motion. Martin claimed the funds were needed to revamp community engagement. City Council commissioned an outside consultant at a cost of $70,000 to provide a report on community engagement; among the recommendations, the consultant provided was the formation of neighborhood enrichment units.

References 

Living people
21st-century American lawyers
American nonprofit businesspeople
Gay politicians
American LGBT city council members
North Carolina Democrats
North Carolina lawyers
North Carolina Central University alumni
North Carolina State University alumni
Philanthropists from North Carolina
Raleigh City Council members
Year of birth missing (living people)